Mercedes Alicia McNab (born March 14, 1980) is a Canadian former actress. She is known for her role as Harmony Kendall on Buffy the Vampire Slayer (1997–2001) and its spinoff Angel (2001–2004). She additionally is known for her role as pretentious Amanda Buckman in Addams Family Values (1993) and Misty in the horror films Hatchet (2007) and Hatchet 2 (2010).

Early life
McNab was born on March 14, 1980, in Vancouver, British Columbia. McNab's father is English former soccer player Bob McNab.

Career
McNab received her first notable acting role in 1991 when she appeared as a Girl Scout selling cookies in The Addams Family. She played a more prominent role in the 1993 sequel Addams Family Values as snobby camper Amanda Buckman. In 1997, McNab was cast in a recurring role on The WB TV show Buffy the Vampire Slayer. McNab had initially auditioned for the lead role of Buffy Summers, which went to Sarah Michelle Gellar, and instead she played  Harmony Kendall, a vapid, popular high-school student who eventually becomes a vampire. She appeared in 16 episodes over four years. McNab reprised this role when she was cast in the spin-off series Angel, which starred David Boreanaz. After a one-off guest role in season two, she became a recurring guest at the start of the show's final season, which aired from 2003 to 2004, and then a series regular midway through.

McNab went on to guest star in shows including Psych and Supernatural. In 2007, she appeared in a lead role in the slasher movie Hatchet, directed by Adam Green. She briefly appeared in the 2010 sequel Hatchet 2 and afterward starred in a number of direct-to-DVD horror movies such as Dark Reel and Thirst, as well as the TV-movie Vipers alongside Tara Reid.

McNab was the cover model for and was featured in a nude pictorial in the November 2006 issue of Playboy magazine. She was also featured in the FHM magazine's January 2004 USA issue.

Personal life
McNab and real-estate developer Mark Henderson married on May 12, 2012, in La Paz, Mexico. The couple have two children, a daughter and a son.

She has not acted professionally since marrying.

Filmography

Film

Television

References

External links

 
 
 

1980 births
Living people
20th-century Canadian actresses
21st-century Canadian actresses
Actresses from Vancouver
Canadian child actresses
Canadian film actresses
Canadian people of English descent
Canadian people of Scottish descent
Canadian television actresses